Thunderbolt (Piklik Foh) is a 1995 Hong Kong action sports film, starring Jackie Chan and directed by Gordon Chan. The action directors were Jackie Chan and Sammo Hung, and the action scenes were performed by the Jackie Chan Stunt Team. In early North American releases, the film was known as Dead Heat.

Thunderbolt is set around the world of auto racing. The film is multilingual; characters speak Cantonese, English and Japanese interchangeably.

Plot
Chan Foh To is a junkyard mechanic and a part-time race car driver who helps the Hong Kong Police Force in their crackdown on illegal street racing in the country. One night, while helping news reporter Amy Yip and Mr. Lam after their Mitsubishi FTO runs out of gasoline, Chan commandeers the car with Amy inside to chase after a speeding black Nissan Skyline GT-R R32 driven by the dangerous criminal driver Warner "Cougar" Kaugman. In the high speed car chase's climax, Chan traps Cougar in a police roadblock and has him apprehended. However, due to a lack of evidence and a warrant for arrest, Cougar is immediately released from police custody. Chan continues to be harassed by Amy, who wants to do a cover story of him.

After Chan fends off against Cougar's thugs at his junkyard, Cougar is once again arrested when Chan provides a false testimony under the guidance of Interpol agent Steve Cannon. However, Cougar's thugs raid the police station and spring him out of jail. The thugs kill all but Cannon, who kills Cougar's girlfriend before they get away. Cougar then destroys the junkyard and injures Chan's father Chun Tung  before taking his younger sisters Dai Mui and Sai Mui hostage to force Chan to race him in Japan.

Chan and his racing team build him a yellow Mitsubishi Lancer Evolution III race car and prepare for his upcoming race, receiving permission from the police to drive it on the expressway. They arrive in Japan, where Chan storms into and destroys a pachinko hall owned by a yakuza gang before Cougar allows Dai Mui to reunite with her brother. Chan makes the starting grid at Sendai Hi-Land Raceway, but his car is destroyed in a collision. Feeling sympathy for Chan, Miss Kenya, the daughter of a Mitsubishi Motors executive, supplies him with two brand-new white Mitsubishi GTO race cars and a supply of Advan tires for the race.

Chan starts at the back of the field, but muscles his way toward the front, despite a 30-second pit penalty and other distractions caused by Amy, but facilitated by the high number of retiring racers. He approaches and battles Cougar for the lead. During the final lap, both cars slide off the track into the gravel pit, facing each other as they struggle to get back on the road. Cougar gets out first, but Chan floors it in reverse before both cars cross the line in a photo finish. Chan wins the race during the spin back forward when his front end touches the finish line first. Cougar attempts to flee from the police, but Chan chases him around the circuit before sending him crashing violently off the track. Chan pulls Cougar out of the burning wreckage for the police to arrest him, and Cannon reveals that he and his team rescued Sai Mui. He then reconciles with Amy and kisses her.

Cast
 Jackie Chan as Chan Foh To / Feng Jim / (Alfred Tung in the U.S. version) (doubled by Chin Kar Lok, Collin Chou and Sam Wong)
 Anita Yuen as Amy Yip / (Amy Ip in the U.S. version)
 Michael Wong as Steve Cannon
 Thorsten Nickel as Warner "Cougar" Krugman
 Rebecca Penrose as Cougar's Girlfriend
 Chor Yuen as Uncle Chan Chun Tung, Foh's father (Alfred's father in the U.S. version) (as Chor Yun)
 Wu Oi-Yan as Dai Mui (Daphne in US version) (as Daisy Wu Oi-Yan)
 Annie Man as Sai Mui / Xiao Wei (Sammi in the U.S. version) (as Man Chung-Han)
 Yūzō Kayama as Coach Murakami
 Kenya Sawada as Saw
 Ken Lo as Kong (as Low Houi Kang)
 Dayo Wong as Mr. Lam (as Wong Tze-Wah)
 Chin Kar-lok as Mirakami's assistant (Ka Lok Chin in the U.S. version) (Chin Ka-Lok in the German version)
 Corey Yuen as The Doctor (Corey Yen in the U.S. version) (Cory Yuen in the German version)
  as Miss Kenya
 Yung Kam-Cheong as Mechanic Cheong (as Peter Yung Kam-Cheong)
 William Tuen as Koo / Ku / Saw's thug
 Bruce Law as Bruce (as Bruce Law Lai Yin)
 Patrick Han as John
 Joseph Cheung as Traffic Officer Joe
 Lam Wai-Kong as Inspector Cheung (Joe in the U.S. version)

Production
Filming took place on several race track locations, including Japan's Sendai Hi-Land Raceway and the Batu Tiga Circuit in Shah Alam, Malaysia.  Variety estimated the budget at almost .

Because Jackie had injured his leg during the shooting of Rumble in the Bronx, he was unable to perform some of the stunts. During the fight-scene at the pachinko hall in Japan, he was forced to use a stunt double for the wide-angle shots.

Reception

Box office 
It premiered during a slump in Hong Kong cinema and, according to Variety, it and Rumble in the Bronx were "more than one-sixth of the combined gross of Hong Kong movies through the end of August."

Overseas, the film grossed  (US$1,402,000) in Taiwan. In China, the film grossed  in Beijing and earned  in distributor rentals across the country. In Japan, the film grossed . In South Korea, it sold 521,121 tickets and grossed . In Spain (released 2000), it sold 61,418 tickets, equivalent to an estimated . Combined, the film grossed an estimated  in Asia and Europe.

Critical reception 
Derek Elley of Variety called it light on plot but full of memorable stunts. Micah Wright of The Cheat Sheet noted similarities to the later Fast & Furious franchise which debuted in 2001, and suggested that Thunderbolt may have inspired the Fast & Furious franchise. In a review for the Hong Kong Film Critics Society, Stephen Teo remarked that Thunderbolt was one of Chan's best films because "it pursues the action aesthetic all the way, never pausing long enough for dramatic frills" like some of the star's other works.

Accolades 
1995 Golden Horse Film Festival
Winner: Best Action Choreography (Corey Yuen)
1996 Hong Kong Film Awards
Nomination: Best Action Choreography

Television 
In the United Kingdom, the film was watched by  viewers on television in 2004, making it the year's ninth most-watched foreign-language film on television (below eight other Hong Kong action films).

References

External links
 
 
 
 

1995 films
1990s action films
1990s Cantonese-language films
Films directed by Gordon Chan
Films set in Hong Kong
Films set in Japan
Films shot in Hong Kong
Films shot in Japan
Films shot in Malaysia
Films shot in Utah
Hong Kong action films
Hong Kong martial arts films
Hong Kong auto racing films
Japan in non-Japanese culture
Yakuza films
1990s Hong Kong films